Chen Yuan (陳垣 1880–1971) was a Chinese historian and educator. Chen, together with Lü Simian, Chen Yinke and Ch'ien Mu, was known as the "Four Greatest Historians" of Modern China (現代四大史學家).

He is known by his work in the fields of religious history, Yuan Dynasty history, textology and textual criticism. Chen was professor of Peking University, Beijing Normal University and Fu Jen Catholic University, and later served as the president of Beijing Normal University. Before 1949, he also served as the president of Metropolitan Library and the Palace Museum library.

From 1917, Chen began to work on history of Christianity in China, and later published his name-earning book Research of Arkaguns in Yuan Dynasty. Arkagun is the name given to Christians in Yuan Dynasty. Subsequently, he published several books about the spreading of Manichaeism, Zoroastrianism and Islam in China. Chen also paid great attention to collation work on Code of Yuan Dynasty. He has also published various works on Buddhism, especially about Qing Dynasty period.

References

1880 births
1971 deaths
20th-century Chinese historians
Academic staff of Beijing Normal University
Chinese scholars of Buddhism
Historians of religion
Educators from Guangdong
Academic staff of Fu Jen Catholic University
Historians from Guangdong
Members of Academia Sinica
Republic of China historians
Republic of China journalists
People from Xinhui District
People's Republic of China historians
Presidents of Beijing Normal University
Writers from Jiangmen